Cherry Hill station is a Baltimore Light Rail stop in Baltimore, Maryland. There is currently no free public parking at this station, but connections can be made to 3 of MTA Maryland's buses from here.

The Cherry Hill stop is accessible to the streets via a walking tunnel. When the station opened in 1992, this raised concerns about safety, as the tunnel could be a hideout for muggers. The agency then known as the Mass Transit Administration pledged to keep a police vehicle parked at the station at all times to address these concerns.

Station layout

References

External links

Schedules
Cherry Hill Light Rail Stop on Google Street View

Baltimore Light Rail stations
Cherry Hill, Baltimore
Railway stations in the United States opened in 1992
1992 establishments in Maryland
Railway stations in Baltimore